WBRA-TV (channel 15) is a PBS member television station in Roanoke, Virginia, United States, owned by Blue Ridge Public Television, Inc. The station's studios are located on McNeil Drive in southwest Roanoke, and its transmitter is located on Poor Mountain in unincorporated southwestern Roanoke County.

From 1981 to 2013 and again from 2014 to 2017, Blue Ridge PBS served all of Southwest Virginia with two satellite stations, WSBN-TV (channel 47), and WSMY-TV (channel 52). Both stations sign off on June 30, 2013, before returning to the airwaves on March 29, 2014, before shutting down for good on March 27, 2017.

History

WBRA-TV signed on for the first time on August 1, 1967. It claims to be the first all-color educational station in the country. It was originally a member of National Educational Television (NET), before that organization was replaced by PBS in 1970.

In the 1980s, WBRA began identifying on-air as Blue Ridge Public Television, due to its location near the Blue Ridge Mountains. On February 19, 2007, it changed its on-air name to Blue Ridge PBS.

Former relays
WBRA established two satellite transmitters—WSBN-TV (channel 47) in Norton was activated in 1971 and WMSY-TV (channel 52) in Marion began operations in 1981. WSBN brought a city-grade PBS signal to the Tri-Cities for the first time; it was carried on the Tri-Cities DirecTV and Dish Network feeds.

In March 2013, Blue Ridge PBS announced that it would close both WSBN-TV and WMSY-TV by June 30, 2013, leaving East Tennessee PBS outlet WETP as the sole source of PBS programming in the Tri-Cities. The move came as a result of budget cuts that followed the elimination of Virginia's funding for public broadcasting stations in 2012. However, station president James Baum told The Roanoke Times that there were no plans to tear down the transmitters, leaving the possibility that WSBN and WMSY could return in the future. WSBN-TV and WMSY-TV officially shut down on June 30, 2013. Both stations returned to the air almost a year later, on March 29, 2014. Later in the year, Blue Ridge PBS created a separate feed of programming branded "Southwest Virginia Public TV" for broadcast on the main feeds of WSBN-TV and WMSY-TV as well as local cable; the channel also airs on WBRA-TV's subchannel 15.2.

WSBN and WMSY went off the air again March 27, 2017, after the microwave feed to both stations from Roanoke failed. Around the same time, WSBN's transmitter was destroyed by a lightning strike. On April 13, 2017, the FCC announced that Blue Ridge PBS had sold the two stations' channel allocations in the 2016–17 spectrum reallocation auction. Blue Ridge Public Television received $5,243,122 for WMSY and $597,793 for WSBN, and elected to take both permanently off-the-air. Blue Ridge Public Television formally returned the WMSY and WSBN licenses to the FCC on November 3, 2017.

Notes:
1. WSBN-TV used the callsign WSVN-TV until March 14, 1983.

Technical information

Subchannels
The station's digital signal is multiplexed:

Analog-to-digital conversion
Blue Ridge PBS' stations shut down their analog signals on June 12, 2009, the official date in which full-power television stations in the United States transitioned from analog to digital broadcasts under federal mandate. The station's digital channel allocations post-transition are as follows:
 WBRA-TV shut down its analog signal, over UHF channel 15; the station's digital signal remained on its pre-transition VHF channel 3. Through the use of PSIP, digital television receivers display the station's virtual channel as its former UHF analog channel 15.
 WSBN-TV shut down its analog signal, over UHF channel 47; the station's digital signal remained on its pre-transition UHF channel 32. Through the use of PSIP, digital television receivers display the station's virtual channel as its former UHF analog channel 47.
 WMSY-TV shut down its analog signal, over UHF channel 52; the station's digital signal remained on its pre-transition UHF channel 42. Through the use of PSIP, digital television receivers display the station's virtual channel as its former UHF analog channel 52, which was among the high band UHF channels (52-69) that were removed from broadcasting use as a result of the transition.

References

External links

BRA-TV
PBS member stations
Roanoke, Virginia
Television channels and stations established in 1967
1967 establishments in Virginia